Nagaraphirom Park is a good atmosphere small public park of about 3 rai (round about 1.1 acres) on the Chao Phraya River in Bangkok. Located on Maharat Road, Phra Borom Maha Ratchawang Subdistrict, Phra Nakhon District behind the Grand Palace between Tha Tian (N8) and Tha Chang Wang Luang Pier (N9).

On June 26, 2009 King Bhumibol Adulyadej (Rama IX) named the park "Nagaraphirom", meaning "delightful park for the townspeople".  

Nagaraphirom Park officially opened in December 2010. The park is open daily from 05:00 a.m. to 09:00 p.m.

In 2016 the Crown Property Bureau (CPB) as owner of the area. There's a project to build a three-storey and a half underground parking garage here. It can accommodate 700 cars, construction takes two years.

References 

Parks in Bangkok
Phra Nakhon district
Buildings and structures on the Chao Phraya River
2009 establishments in Thailand